State Route 131 (SR 131) is a  east–west state highway located entirely within Barbour County, Alabama. The route serves as the main road in Bakerhill.

Route description
The road starts near Blue Springs at SR 10. The road has no major junctions, and the only junctions are minor county routes. The route goes past Bakerhill and then ends at U.S. Route 431 (US 431), the whole route is basically used as a shortcut between Clio and Blue Springs to the major town of Eufaula.

Major intersections

References

External links

131
Transportation in Barbour County, Alabama